Aluminium (also aluminum in the US and Canada) is a chemical element with symbol Al and atomic number 13.

Aluminium or aluminum may also refer to:
"Aluminum", a song from the 2001 album White Blood Cells, by The White Stripes
"Aluminum", a song from the 2003 album Everything to Everyone, by the Barenaked Ladies
Aluminum, a solo album by John Thomas Griffith
"Aluminium", a song by Damon Albarn
Aluminium (album) a music and art project based upon the White Stripes' music; also an album released by that project
Aluminium: The Thirteenth Element, an encyclopedia on the element
 Aluminum, an American automobile built by Aluminum Manufacturers, Inc. of Cleveland

See also

 Isotopes of aluminium
 Transparent aluminum, a Star Trek fictional material
 Al (disambiguation)